Sanhe is a township of Jingning County in eastern Gansu province, China, located about  northwest of the county seat and  south and west of the border with Ningxia. , it has 12 villages under its administration.

See also 
 List of township-level divisions of Gansu

References 

Township-level divisions of Gansu
Jingning County, Gansu